Elections to the Wigan council were held on Thursday, 5 May 1994, with one third of the seats up for election. Prior to the election, Labour had defended their seats in two by-elections for Abram and Hindley. The election suffered from a mixture of a poor contesting rate and low voter turnout. The number of candidates contesting was just 50, the lowest since 1975, with four wards going unopposed, and Lib Dems back to fighting a half of the seats, and the Conservatives less than two-thirds. The only other opposition standing were three Independent Labour candidates, one of which was the previous - but since deselected - Labour incumbent for the seat being fought in Worsley Mesnes. Voter turnout rose from the previous election's nadir, but at 30.4%, still well below average.

Labour achieved their highest vote share to date, with an overwhelming 70.3% of votes cast. Conversely the Conservatives obtained both their lowest vote share, and lowest vote figure, on record. The Lib Dems, whilst suffering a drop to 16% - a figure below average for results in recent years - witnessed nothing as dramatic. Party seat totals remained unchanged, with Labour and the Lib Dems gaining a seat from each other. The Lib Dem narrowly gained (by just four votes) their third in Beech Hill, turning a ward entirely represented by Labour from the early to mid eighties, into solely Lib Dem for the first time. Labour elsewhere regained a seat in Hope Carr, returning that to entirely Labour.

Election result

This result had the following consequences for the total number of seats on the Council after the elections:

Ward results

References

1994 English local elections
1994
1990s in Greater Manchester